The 1984 United States House of Representatives election in Wyoming was held on November 6, 1984. Incumbent Representative Dick Cheney defeated Hugh B. McFadden, Jr. with 73.57% of the vote.

Democratic Primary

Results

References

Wyoming
1984
1984 Wyoming elections
Dick Cheney